WASP-61 is a single F-type main-sequence star about 1560 light-years away. The star age is much likely younger than the Sun's at approximately 3.8 billion years.  WASP-61 is depleted in heavy elements, having just 40% of the solar abundance of iron.

Planetary system
In 2012 a transiting superjovian planet b was detected on a tight, circular orbit.

The planetary orbit is well aligned with the equatorial plane of the star, misalignment equal to  4.0°

References

Lepus (constellation)
F-type main-sequence stars
Planetary systems with one confirmed planet
Planetary transit variables
J05011191-2603149